Third Brook flows into West Brook by Walton, New York.

References

Rivers of New York (state)
Rivers of Delaware County, New York
Tributaries of the West Branch Delaware River